The phrase land of poets is commonly used to describe Chile because of its highly-valued poetry tradition. The phrase is most often associated with the fact that Chilean poets have twice obtained Nobel Prize in Literature for their works: Gabriela Mistral in 1945 and Pablo Neruda in 1971. According to the Austral University of Chile academician Oscar Galindo, the concept of Chile as the "land of poets" is mostly foreign.

See also
Coast of Poets, near Valparaíso

References

Chilean poetry